Eucalyptus foliosa is a species of mallee that is endemic to Western Australia. It has a dense crown with foliage reaching to the ground, smooth greyish bark, linear to narrow lance-shaped or narrow oblong adult leaves, flower buds in groups of seven or nine, white flowers and conical to shortened hemispherical fruit. It is only known from a small area near Esperance.

Description
It has a dense crown of glossy green leaves that reaches to the ground. The bark is smooth and greyish with brownish patches and sometimes hangs in ribbons.

Taxonomy and naming
Eucalyptus foliosa was first formally described in 1992 by Ken Hill and Lawrie Johnson in the journal Telopea from a specimen collected north of Esperance. The specific epithet (foliosa) is a Latin word meaning "leafy", referring to the dense crown of this species.

Distribution and habitat
This mallee is found growing in sandy clay soils on flat areas adjacent to salt lakes and has a limited range near Esperance in the Esperance Plains and Mallee biogeographic regions of Western Australia.

Conservation status
This eucalypt is listed as critically endangered by IUCN. It is considered "Priority Three" by the Western Australian Government Department of Parks and Wildlife.

See also
List of Eucalyptus species

References

foliosa
Endemic flora of Western Australia
Mallees (habit)
Myrtales of Australia
Eucalypts of Western Australia
Goldfields-Esperance
Plants described in 1992
Taxa named by Lawrence Alexander Sidney Johnson
Taxa named by Ken Hill (botanist)